GCR (or GCRS) may refer to:

Science 
 Galactic cosmic ray, a cosmic ray from outside the Solar System
 Geocentric Celestial Reference System, a coordinate system for near-Earth objects like satellites
 Geological Conservation Review, a procedure of the British Joint Nature Conservation Committee
 Global catastrophic risk, a potential catastrophe that would affect the whole world 
 Global Competitiveness Report, a yearly report published by the World Economic Forum
 Glucocorticoid receptor, a cell protein which responds to glucocorticoid compounds

Technology 
 Gas-cooled reactor, a type of nuclear reactor
 Ghost-canceling reference, a television subsignal
 Grey component replacement, substitution of black ink for gray ink in color printing
 Group coded recording, a technique for encoding digital data on magnetic tape or disk

Transportation 
 GCR, ICAO code for Tianjin Airlines, China
 GCR, stock symbol for Gaylord Container Corporation, an American packing material manufacturer
 Great Central Railway, a British railway company
 Great Central Railway (heritage railway)
 Great Central Railway (Nottingham)

Other uses 
 Glass City Rollers, an American roller derby league
 Graduate Common Room, a Common Room (university) for postgraduate students
 Global Corruption Report by Transparency International
 Gray City Rebels, a Brazilian roller derby league
 Green Corn Revival, an American band
 gcr, ISO 639-3 code for the French Guianese Creole language
  (Revolutionary Communist Group (Lebanon)), a Lebanese Trotskyite group